Rahul Uttamrao Dhikale is an Indian politician. He is a Member of the Bhartiya Janata Party. In 2019, he was elected as Member of the Legislative Assembly of the Nashik East Constituency in Maharashtra.

Early life and family 
Rahul Dhikale was born on 14 August 1979. His father late Uttamrao Dhikale was a member of 13th Loksabha of India from Nashik Constituency. His education is Bachelor in Law(LLB) from N.B.T. Law College Nashik. At the age of twelve, Rahul Dhikale trained in wrestling and participated in Maharashtra Hind Kesari competitions. In the year of 1995, Rahul Dhikale won Nashik's Mayor Kesari Competition.

Political career 
Rahul Dhikale elected as Councilor in Nashik Municipal Corporation (2012-2017). In 2014-2015 he was Chairman of Standing Committee in Nashik Municipal Corporation. In 2019, Rahul Dhikale won election of Legislative Assembly in Maharashtra from Nashik East Constituency.

Awards 

 Winner of Nashik's Mayor Kesari - 1995

References 

Maharashtra MLAs 2019–2024
1979 births
Bharatiya Janata Party politicians from Maharashtra
Living people
People from Nashik district